Clear Space Force Station is a United States Space Force radar station for detecting incoming ICBMs and submarine-launched ballistic missiles to NORAD's command center and to provide Space Surveillance data to the United States Space Force.  Clear's AN/FPS-123 Upgraded Early Warning Radar is part of the Solid State Phased Array Radar System (SSPARS) which also includes those at Beale AFB, Cape Cod Space Force Station, RAF Fylingdales and Thule Site J.  The "historic property" was one of the Alaska World War II Army Airfields and later a Cold War BMEWS site providing NORAD data to Colorado's BMEWS Central Computer and Display Facility (CC&DF).

In addition to the "original camp area" with buildings still in use today, areas of the station include the airfield , the "SSPARS Site" the technical site (Utilador, BMEWS reflectors, support buildings, power plant), and the composite site (two permanent dormitories, a mess hall, recreation area, and administrative area).  In addition to the Air National Guard unit, Clear has active duty USSF, Royal Canadian Air Force, civilian, and contractor personnel.

History 

The site's land with the 1918 Alaska Railroad was purchased by the Department of the Interior in 1949 for Alaskan Air Command's Clear Air Force Auxiliary Field for use as a Ladd Field gunnery range.  Total costs for the planned Thule and Clear BMEWS stations in a May 1958 estimate were ~$800 million—an October 13, 1958, plan for both estimated completion in September 1960.  An additional  area was appropriated for BMEWS Site II (cf. BMEWS Site I at Thule).

This has transported coal for the power station and heavy equipment.

Clear Missile Early Warning Station
Clear Missile Early Warning Station construction began in August 1958 with 700 workers—i.e., a "construction" camp was being erected in September 1958 by "Patti-McDonald and Morrison-Knudsen" next to the railroad (for $1.7 million, 40,000 ft of railroad were moved by 1959.)  Groundbreaking for radar structures was May 1959 ("Baker and Ford built a transmitter and computer building; a heat dissipation system; a radar transmitter building; wells and pumphouses; a fire station; and utilities") and the AN/FPS-50 pedestals were complete by June 2, 1959.  In 1959 after the original White Alice Communications System contract, "the next segment of WACS... was series of TD-2 microwave installations to support... two routes [that] linked the Ballistic Missile Early Warning Site (BMEWS) at Clear AFB... one going down the southeast coast (the A route) to the Ketchikan-Seattle submarine cable*, and the other, going east to the Canada–US border (B Route) through Canada, down to the lower 48 which was Clear's Rearward Communications System to Murphy Dome (A Route) and the Gold King Creek AFS (B Route) with data for the Ent AFB CC&DF.

Three GE AN/FPS-50 Radar Sets were installed with antenna reflectors  that each weigh .  The "Building Two" middle transmitter building had the radar control room and room with the Sylvania AN/FSQ-28 Missile Impact Predictor Set.

The "Clear Msl Early Warning Stn, Nenana, AK" was assigned to Hanscom Field, Massachusetts, on April 1, 1961, and BMEWS Site II was completed July 1, 1961 (the date of IOC--Full operational capability was declared three months later.)

Clear transferred to Air Defense Command in November 1961. By mid-1962, BMEWS "quick fixes" for ECCM had been installed at Thule and Clear and by June 30, 1962, Ent AFB integration of BMEWS and SPADATS data was completed.  On July 31, 1962, NORAD recommended a tracking radar at Clear to close the BMEWS gap with Thule for low-angle missiles vice those with the 15-65 degree angle for which BMEWS was designed (North Dakota's Cavalier AFS radar built in 1975 currently monitors for Hudson Bay launches.)

Missile warning operations
Detachment 2 of the 71st Missile Warning Wing was responsible for operations by civilian contractor personnel until 1964, when Air Force personnel began permanently manning the Tactical Operations Room (TOR).

In 1964, the Good Friday earthquake struck, and Clear was unable to perform its mission for six minutes.

In 1966, the last of the five BMEWS tracking radars was installed, an RCA AN/FPS-92 Radar Set with an  diameter antenna housed in a  diameter radome. The FPS-92 was an improved AN/FPS-49 Radar Set variant with radome blocks having two high-density 1 millimeter thick skins that cover a 15 centimeter thick Kraft-paper core (total of 1,646 hexagonal and pentagonal blocks (the hexagonal blocks were "66-inch panels".) The completion of the FPS-92 raised the final construction price of the missile warning system at Clear to $300 million. $62 million of this figure had been spent by the Alaska District of the Corps of Engineers.)
 
Clear provided emergency shelter for 216 flood refugees during August 1967, the same year many "temporary" buildings were replaced. Personnel at the installation subsequently provided measurements for a University of Alaska experiment which injected sulfur hexafluoride into the upper atmosphere to see if the Aurora Borealis could be affected.  Clear had Bomb Alarm System equipment installed by the time the BAS was accepted on 10 February 1961. The BAS was deactivated in 1970.  In 1975, the Secretary of Defense told Congress that Clear Air Force Station would be closed when the Shemya Island and Beale AFB radars became operational.  After a Thule radome fire, Clear's FPS-92 radome was replaced in 1981 by first disassembling the tracker, constructing the new radome, and reconstructing the FPS-92.  Clear's 1st all-female crew pulled its 1st shift on February 28, 1986 (the 1st female, Lt. Anderson was assigned in 1973.)

Beginning in 1987, ITT operated and maintained the Clear BMEWS
under a USAF Space Command contract and in the 1990s, the Southwest Research Institute upgraded Clear's pulse modulator for the transmitter final-stage power amplifier.

Phased array radar

On April 16, 1998, groundbreaking for installing 1987 AN/FPS-115 PAVE PAWS components from Texas (e.g., the array elements) was held at Clear for the more advanced Raytheon AN/FPS-120 with 2500 "solid state transmitter" modules.  On December 15, 2000, the FPS-50 and −92 transmissions ceased (all of the Arecibo Observatory's Litton L-5773 klystrons were obtained as surplus from Clear's decommissioned BMEWS transmitters.)  Clear's FPS-120 began 24-hour operations when Clear's SSPARS Site (separate from the BMEWS site) had Initial Operational Capability on January 31, 2001; the date the entire SSPARS became operational  (SSPARS sites were modified in the Early Warning Radar Service Life Extension Program.)

On August 30, 2006, after a transition that began in 2001, the ANG's 213th Space Warning Squadron took on the early warning/space surveillance mission.  BAE Systems began a 2007 contract for SSPARS maintenance, and the Clear FPS-120 was subsequently upgraded to an AN/FPS-132 Upgraded Early Warning Radar (UEWR) by Boeing Integrated Defense Systems "featuring processor and software improvements to enhance capability."

On 15 June 2021 it was renamed from Clear Air Force Station to Clear Space Force Station.

Long Range Discrimination Radar was being tested at the base in 2022.

Based units 
Units based at Clear Air Force Station.

Those marked as GSU are Geographically Separate Units, which although based at Clear, are subordinate a unit based at another location.

United States Space Force 
Space Operations Command

 Space Delta 4
 13th Space Warning Squadron (GSU)

United States Air Force 
Alaska Air National Guard

 168th Wing
 168th Operations Group
 213th Space Warning Squadron (GSU)

Units to which assigned 
 2006: 213th Space Warning Squadron
 1983: 1st Space Wing (Air Force Space Command)
 1979: 15th Air Force (Strategic Air Command) 
 1971: Fourteenth Aerospace Force (Aerospace Defense Command)
 1967: 13th Missile Warning Squadron (Outstanding Unit Award in 1970 and 1973)
 1961: Detachment 2, 71st Missile Warning Wing
 1961: Electronic Systems Division
 1949: Alaskan Air Command

References

External links

Buildings and structures in Denali Borough, Alaska
Buildings and structures completed in 1959
1959 establishments in Alaska
Historic American Engineering Record in Alaska
Installations of the United States Space Force
Military installations established in 1959